Kal is a settlement in the Municipality of Hrastnik in central Slovenia. It lies in the hills north of Dol pri Hrastniku. The area is part of the traditional region of Styria. It is now included with the rest of the municipality in the Central Sava Statistical Region. Kal includes the hamlets of Spodnji Kal (or Mali Kal) and Veliki Kal.

Geography

Kal Hill stands on the northern edge of the settlement, and Pleše Hill and Long Peak stand south of the village core. There is road access to the village via a steep road from Dol pri Hrastniku and a newer road from Čeče. The higher levels of the settlement stand on limestone, and at lower elevations shale, sandstone, and conglomerate rock are found. The soil is loamy and sensitive to droughts.

History
The Kal area was settled relatively late. It was still uninhabited in the 13th century, but farms were attested in the area in the 16th century. A school was established in the settlement in 1908. Classes were initially held in a private home; after that building burned down, a school building was built in 1927. A mountain lodge was built on Kal Hill in 1948.

Mass grave
Kal is the site of a mass grave associated with the Second World War. The Paradise Valley Mass Grave is located under a log cabin at the beginning of the Paradise Valley ski lift. It contains the remains of 40 Slovenian families from Lower Carniola that were transported to the valley and murdered.

References

External links
Kal on Geopedia

Populated places in the Municipality of Hrastnik